The Cestus Deception is a science fiction novel by Steven Barnes set in the Star Wars galaxy during the Clone Wars. The book takes place one year after the Battle of Geonosis in Star Wars: Episode II – Attack of the Clones, and 21 years before the Battle of Yavin in Episode IV: A New Hope.

Plot
Set during the Clone Wars, the story follows Jedi Knights Obi-Wan Kenobi and Kit Fisto and their adventures as ambassadors on the planet of Ord Cestus, which has started producing so-called "Jedi Killer" droids. While, Obi-Wan Kenobi takes the diplomatic approach with the leadership, Kit Fisto and a clone trooper squad start recruiting and training fighters from the working class of the planet to incite a rebellion, should Obi-Wan fail. While they deal with the intrigue and politicking of the locals, as well as intervention by the Sith minion Asajj Ventress, a love affair forms between one of their clone trooper bodyguards Nate and a female pilot who is attracted to the clone template Jango Fett.

Characters
 Obi-Wan Kenobi: Jedi Knight (male human)
 Kit Fisto: Jedi Master (male Nautolan)
 Doolb Snoil: barrister (male Vippit of Nal Hutta)
 Admiral Arikakon Baraka: supercruiser commander and trainer of the Clone Troopers of the Republic (male Mon Calamari)
 Lido Shan: technician (humanoid)
 A-98: "Nate"; ARC Trooper, recruitment and command
 CT-X270: "Xutoo"; ARC Trooper, pilot
 CT-36/732: "Sirty"; ARC Trooper, logistics
 CT-44/444: "Forry"; ARC Trooper, physical training
 CT-12/74: "Seefor"; ARC Trooper, communications
 Trillot: gang leader (male/female X'Ting)
 Fizzik: broodmate of Trillot (male X'Ting)
 Sheeka Tull: pilot (female human)
 Resta Shug Hai: Desert Wind member (female X'Ting)
 Thak Val Zsing: leader of Desert Wind (male human)
 Brother Nicos Fate: (male X'Ting)
 Skot OnSon: Desert Wind member (male human)
 Debbikin: research (male human)
 Lady Por'Ten: energy (female human)
 Kefka: manufacturing (male humanoid)
 Llitishi: sales and marketing (male Wroonian)
 Palpatine: Chancellor of the Republic, dispatcher (male human)
 Caiza Quill: mining (male X'Ting)
 G'Mai Duris: Regent (female X'Ting)
 Shar Shar: Regent Duris's assistant (female Zeetsa)
 Count Dooku: leader of the Confederacy of Independent Systems (male human)
 Commander Asajj Ventress: Commander of the Separatist Droid Army (female humanoid)

Publishing
The Cestus Deception was first published on June 1, 2004 by Del Rey Books as a hardcover novel. Its paperback ISBN number is 9780345458988

References

External links
 Amazon.com Listing
 Official CargoBay Listing

2004 novels
2004 science fiction novels
Star Wars Legends novels
Del Rey books